Araneus corticarius is a species of orb weaver in the spider family Araneidae. It is found in the United States and Canada.

References

Araneus
Articles created by Qbugbot
Spiders described in 1884